The Yucca Mountain Nuclear Waste Repository, as designated by the Nuclear Waste Policy Act amendments of 1987, is a proposed deep geological repository storage facility within Yucca Mountain for spent nuclear fuel and other high-level radioactive waste in the United States.

The project was approved in 2002 by the 107th United States Congress, but the 112th Congress ended federal funding for the site via amendment to the Department of Defense and Full-Year Continuing Appropriations Act, passed on April 14, 2011, during the Obama Administration. The project has encountered many difficulties and was highly contested by the public, the Western Shoshone peoples, and many politicians. The project also faces strong state and regional opposition. The Government Accountability Office stated that the closure was for political, not technical or safety reasons.

Under President Barack Obama, the Department of Energy (DOE) reviewed options other than Yucca Mountain for a high-level waste repository. The Blue Ribbon Commission on America's Nuclear Future, established by the Secretary of Energy, released its final report in January 2012. It detailed an urgent need to find a site suitable for constructing a consolidated geological repository, stating that any future facility should be developed by a new independent organization with direct access to the Nuclear Waste Fund, which is not subject to political and financial control as the Cabinet-level DOE is. But the site met with strong opposition in Nevada, including from then-Senate leader Harry Reid.

Under President Donald Trump, the DOE ceased deep borehole and other non–Yucca Mountain waste disposition research activities. For FY18, the DOE requested $120 million and the NRC $30 million from Congress to continue licensing activities for the Yucca Mountain Repository. For FY19, the DOE again requested $120 million but the NRC increased its request to $47.7 million. Congress decided to provide no funding for the remainder of FY18. In May 2019, Representative John Shimkus reintroduced a bill in the House for the site, but the Appropriation Committee killed an amendment by Representative Mike Simpson to add $74 million in Yucca Mountain funding to a DOE appropriations bill. On May 20, 2020, Under Secretary of Energy Mark W. Menezes testified in front of the Senate Energy and Natural Resources Committee that Trump strongly opposes proceeding with Yucca Mountain Repository.

In May 2021, Energy Secretary Jennifer Granholm said that Yucca Mountain would not be part of the Biden administration's plans for nuclear-waste disposal. She anticipated announcing the department's next steps "in the coming months".

Introduction 

Spent nuclear fuel is the radioactive by-product of electricity generation at commercial nuclear power plants, and high-level radioactive waste is the by-product of reprocessing spent fuel to produce fissile material for nuclear weapons. In 1982, Congress established a national policy to solve the problem of nuclear waste disposal. This policy is a federal law called the Nuclear Waste Policy Act, which made the U.S. Department of Energy (DOE) responsible for finding a site, building, and operating an underground disposal facility called a geologic repository. The recommendation to use a geologic repository dates to 1957, when the National Academy of Sciences recommended that the best way to protect the environment and public health and safety is to dispose of the waste in rock deep underground.

An estimated  of the waste would be from America's military nuclear programs.

On December 19, 1984, the DOE selected ten locations in six states for consideration as potential repository sites, based on data collected for nearly ten years. The ten sites were studied and results of these preliminary studies were reported in 1985. Based on these reports, President Ronald Reagan approved three sites for intensive scientific study called site characterization. The three sites were Hanford, Washington; Deaf Smith County, Texas; and Yucca Mountain.

In 1987, Congress amended the Nuclear Waste Policy Act and directed DOE to study only Yucca Mountain, which is adjacent to the former nuclear test site. The Act provided that if during site characterization Yucca Mountain was found unsuitable, studies would stop immediately. This option expired when Reagan actually recommended the site.
On July 23, 2002, President George W. Bush signed House Joint Resolution 87, allowing the DOE to take the next step in establishing a safe repository in which to store nuclear waste. The DOE was to begin accepting spent fuel at the Yucca Mountain Repository by January 31, 1998, but did not do so because of a series of delays due to legal challenges, concerns over how to transport nuclear waste to the facility, and political pressure resulting in underfunding of the construction.

On July 18, 2006, the DOE proposed March 31, 2017, as the date to open the facility and begin accepting waste based on full funding. On September 8, 2006, Bush nominated Ward (Edward) Sproat, a nuclear industry executive formerly of PECO energy in Pennsylvania, to lead the Yucca Mountain Project. Following the 2006 midterm Congressional elections, Harry Reid, a longtime opponent of the repository, became the Senate Majority Leader, putting him in a position to greatly affect the future of the project. Reid said he would continue to work to block completion of the project, and is quoted as having said, "Yucca Mountain is dead. It'll never happen."

In the 2008 Omnibus Spending Bill, the Yucca Mountain Project's budget was reduced to $390 million. The project was able to reallocate resources and delay transportation expenditures to complete the License Application for submission on June 3, 2008. During his 2008 presidential campaign, Barack Obama promised to abandon the project. After his election, the Nuclear Regulatory Commission told Obama he did not have the ability to do so. On April 23, 2009, Lindsey Graham and eight other senators introduced legislation to provide "rebates" from a $30 billion federally managed fund into which nuclear power plants had been paying, so as to refund all collected funds if Congress canceled the project.

In November 2013, in response to a lawsuit filed by the National Association of Regulatory Utility Commissioners and the Nuclear Energy Institute, the US court of appeals ruled that nuclear utilities may stop paying into the nuclear waste recovery fund until either the DOE follows the Nuclear Waste Policy Act, which designates Yucca Mountain as the repository, or Congress changes the law. The fee ended May 16, 2014.

Lacking an operating repository, the federal government initially paid utility companies somewhere between $300 and $500 million per year in compensation for failing to comply with the contract it signed to take the spent nuclear fuel by 1998. For the ten years after 2015, it is estimated to cost taxpayers $24 billion in payments from the Judgment Fund. The Judgment Fund is not subject to budget rules and allows Congress to ignore the nuclear waste issue since payments therefrom do not have any impact on yearly spending for other programs.

Facility 

The purpose of the Yucca Mountain project is to comply with the Nuclear Waste Policy Act of 1982 and develop a national site for spent nuclear fuel and high-level radioactive waste storage. The management and operating contractor as of April 1, 2009 for the project is USA Repository Services (USA-RS), a wholly owned subsidiary of URS Corporation (now part of AECOM) with supporting principal subcontractors Shaw Corporation (now part of McDermott International Inc.) and Areva Federal Services LLC (now Orano federal services business).

After the layoff of 800 employees on March 31, 2009, about 100 employees remained on the project until all technical staff were laid off by the end of FY 2010 due to zero funding in the 2011 budget for the Office of Civilian Radioactive Waste Management. Sandia National Laboratories was responsible for post-closure analysis and ensuring compliance with the NWPA.

There are also several cathedral-like alcoves that branch from the main tunnel. Most of the scientific experiments were conducted in these alcoves. The emplacement drifts (smaller-diameter tunnels branching off the main tunnel) where waste would have been stored were not constructed since they required authorization from the Nuclear Regulatory Commission.

To store that much waste would have required  of tunnels. The 104 U.S. commercial reactors currently operating will produce this quantity of spent fuel by 2014, assuming that the spent fuel rods are not reprocessed. Currently, the US has no civil reprocessing plant.

By 2008, Yucca Mountain was one of the most studied pieces of geology in the world; between geologic studies and materials science, the United States had invested US$9 billion on the project. This site studied by the Nevada Bureau of Mines and Geology (NBMG) differs substantially from other potential repositories due to the finding of natural analogues of nuclear material that are currently being studied.

The cost of the facility is being paid for by a combination of a tax on each kilowatt hour of nuclear power and by the taxpayers for disposal of weapons and naval nuclear waste. Based on the 2001 cost estimate, about 73% is funded by consumers of nuclear-powered electricity and 27% by the taxpayers.

The Total System Life Cycle Cost Director Sproat presented to Congress on July 15, 2008, was $90 billion. This cost could not be compared to previous estimates since it included a repository capacity about twice as large as previously estimated over a much longer period of time (100 years vs. 30 years). Additionally, the cost of the project continued to escalate because of insufficient funding to most efficiently move forward and complete the project.

It now sits at its exit point at the South Portal (south entrance) of the facility. The short side tunnel alcoves were excavated using explosives.

Opposition 

By 2010, years after this deadline, the future status of the repository at Yucca Mountain was still unknown due to ongoing litigation, and opposition by Harry Reid.

Because of construction delays, a number of nuclear power plants in the United States have resorted to dry cask storage of waste on-site indefinitely in steel and concrete casks.

The project is widely opposed in Nevada and is a hotly debated national topic. A two-thirds majority of Nevadans feel it is unfair for their state to have to store nuclear waste when there are no nuclear power plants in Nevada. Many Nevadans' opposition stemmed from the so-called "Screw Nevada Bill," the 1987 legislation halting study of Hanford and Texas as potential sites for the waste before conclusions could be made. The county containing the proposed facility, Nye County, supports the repository's development, as do six adjoining counties. A 2015 survey of Nevadans found 55% agreeing that the state should be open to discussion of what benefits could be received.

One point of concern has been the standard of radiation emission in 10,000 to 1,000,000 years. On August 9, 2005, the United States Environmental Protection Agency (EPA) proposed a limit of 350 millirem per year for that period. In October 2007, the DOE issued a draft of the Supplemental Environmental Impact Statement showing that for the first 10,000 years mean public dose would be 0.24 mrem/year and that thereafter the median public dose would be 0.98 mrem/year, both of which are substantially below the proposed EPA limit. For comparison, a hip X-ray results in a dose around 83 mrem and a CT head or chest scan results in around 1,110 mrem. Annually, in the United States, an individual's dose from background radiation is about 350 mrem, though some places get more than twice that.

On February 12, 2002, Secretary of Energy Spencer Abraham decided that this site was suitable to be the nation's nuclear repository. The governor of Nevada had 90 days to object and did so, but Congress overrode the objection. If the governor's objection had stood, the project would have been abandoned and a new site chosen. In August 2004, the repository became an election issue when Senator John Kerry said he would abandon the plans if elected.

In March 2005, the Energy and Interior departments revealed that several U.S. Geological Survey hydrologists had exchanged emails discussing possible falsification of quality assurance documents on water infiltration research. On February 17, 2006, the DOE's Office of Civilian Radioactive Waste Management (OCRWM) released a report confirming the technical soundness of infiltration modeling work performed by U.S. Geological Survey (USGS) employees. In March 2006, the U.S. Senate Committee on Environment and Public Works Majority Staff issued a 25-page white paper, "Yucca Mountain: The Most Studied Real Estate on the Planet." The conclusions were:

 Extensive studies consistently show Yucca Mountain to be a sound site for nuclear waste disposal
 The cost of not moving forward is extremely high
 Nuclear waste disposal capability is an environmental imperative
 Nuclear waste disposal capability supports national security
 Demand for new nuclear plants also demands disposal capability

On January 18, 2006, DOE OCRWM announced that it would designate Sandia National Laboratories as its lead laboratory to integrate repository science work for the Yucca Mountain Project. "We believe that establishing Sandia as our lead laboratory is an important step in our new path forward. The independent, expert review that the scientists at Sandia will perform will help ensure that the technical and scientific basis for the Yucca Mountain repository is without question," OCRWM's Acting Director Paul Golan said. "Sandia has unique experience in managing scientific investigations in support of a federally licensed geologic disposal facility, having served in that role as the scientific advisor to the Waste Isolation Pilot Plant in Carlsbad, New Mexico." Sandia began acting as the lead laboratory on October 1, 2006.

Because of questions raised by the State of Nevada and Congressional members about the quality of the science behind Yucca Mountain, the DOE announced on March 31, 2006, the selection of Oak Ridge Associated Universities/Oak Ridge Institute for Science and Education (a not-for-profit consortium that includes 96 doctoral degree-granting institutions and 11 associate member universities) to provide expert reviews of scientific and technical work on the Yucca Mountain Project. DOE stated that the project "will be based on sound science. By bringing in Oak Ridge for review of technical work, DOE will seek to present a high level of expertise and credibility as they move the project forward ... This award gives DOE access to academic and research institutions to help DOE meet their mission and legal obligation to license, construct, and open Yucca Mountain as the nation's repository for spent nuclear fuel."

There was significant public and political opposition to the project in Nevada. An attempt was made to push ahead with it and override the opposition. But for large projects that would take decades to complete, there is every chance that sustained local opposition will prevail, and this happened with the Yucca Mountain project. Successful nuclear waste storage siting efforts in Scandinavia have involved local communities in the decision-making process and given them a veto at each stage, but this did not happen with Yucca Mountain. Local communities at potential storage and repository sites "should have early and continued involvement in the process, including funding that would allow them to retain technical experts".

On March 5, 2009, Energy Secretary Steven Chu reiterated in a Senate hearing that the Yucca Mountain site was no longer considered an option for storing reactor waste.

On March 3, 2010, the DOE filed a motion with the NRC to withdraw its license application, but multiple lawsuits to stop this action have been filed by states, counties, and individuals across the country as being unauthorized by the NWPA.

The costly nuclear accident in 2014 at New Mexico's Waste Isolation Pilot Plant in which a nuclear waste container exploded has caused doubt that it could serve as an alternative for Yucca.

In January 2019, Governor Steve Silolak vowed that "not one ounce" of nuclear waste would be allowed at Yucca Mountain, and a May funding bill did not include funding for the site. In May 2019, the Reno Gazette-Journal published a long-form essay cataloging opposition to the Yucca Mountain project. According to a tribal elder, the Western Shoshone view Yucca Mountain as sacred and a nuclear storage facility "will poison everything. It's people's life, our Mother Earth's life, all the living things here, all the creatures; whatever's crawling around, it's their life too." The tribes say they lack funds to discredit federal safety claims, but will be directly affected by a potential disaster.

Radiation standards

Original standard 
The EPA established its Yucca Mountain standards in June 2001. The storage standard set a dose limit of 15 millirem per year for the public outside the Yucca Mountain site. The disposal standards consisted of three components: an individual dose standard, a standard evaluating the impacts of human intrusion into the repository, and a groundwater protection standard. The individual-protection and human intrusion standards set a limit of 15 millirem per year to a reasonably maximally exposed individual, who would be among the most highly exposed members of the public.

The groundwater protection standard is consistent with EPA's Safe Drinking Water Act standards, which the Agency applies in many situations as a pollution prevention measure. The disposal standards were to apply for 10,000 years after the facility is closed. Dose assessments were to continue beyond 10,000 years and be placed in DOE's Environmental Impact Statement, but were not subject to a compliance standard.

The 10,000-year period for compliance assessment is consistent with EPA's generally applicable standards developed under the Nuclear Waste Policy Act. It also reflects international guidance regarding the level of confidence that can be placed in numerical projections over very long periods of time.

Inconsistent standards 
Shortly after the EPA first established these standards in 2001, the nuclear industry, several environmental and public interest groups, and the State of Nevada challenged the standards in court. In July 2004, the Court of Appeals for the District of Columbia Circuit found in favor of the Agency on all counts except one: the 10,000 year regulatory time frame. The court ruled that EPA's 10,000-year compliance period for isolation of radioactive waste was not consistent with National Academy of Sciences (NAS) recommendations and was too short.

The NAS report had recommended standards be set for the time of peak risk, which might approach a period of one million years. By limiting the compliance time to 10,000 years, EPA did not respect a statutory requirement that it develop standards consistent with NAS recommendations.

EPA's rule 
EPA published in the Federal Register a final rule in 2009. The new rule limits radiation doses from Yucca Mountain for up to 1,000,000 years after it closes. Within that regulatory time frame, the EPA has two dose standards that would apply based on the number of years from the time the facility is closed.

For the first 10,000 years, the EPA would retain the 2001 final rule's dose limit of 15 millirem per year. This is protection at the level of the most stringent radiation regulations in the U.S. today. From 10,000 to one million years, EPA established a dose limit of 100 millirem per year. EPA's rule requires DOE to show that Yucca Mountain can safely contain wastes, considering the effects of earthquakes, volcanic activity, climate change, and container corrosion, over one million years. The current analysis indicates that the repository will cause less than 1 mrem/year public dose for 1,000,000 years.

Geology 

The formation that makes up Yucca Mountain was created by several large eruptions from a caldera volcano and is composed of alternating layers of ignimbrite (welded tuff), non-welded tuff, and semi-welded tuff. The tuff surrounding the burial sites is expected to protect human health as it provides a natural barrier to the radiation. It lies along the transition between the Mojave and the Great Basin Deserts.

The volcanic tuff at Yucca Mountain is appreciably fractured and movement of water through an aquifer below the waste repository is primarily through fractures. Future water transport from the surface to waste containers is likely to be dominated by fractures.

The aquifer of Yucca Mountain drains to Amargosa Valley, home to over 1400 people and a number of endangered species.

Some site opponents assert that, after the predicted containment failure of the waste containers, these cracks may provide a route for movement of radioactive waste that dissolves in the water flowing downward from the desert surface. Officials state that the waste containers will be stored in such a way as to minimize or even nearly eliminate this possibility.

The area around Yucca Mountain received much more rain in the geologic past and the water table was consequently much higher than it is today, though well below the level of the repository.

Earthquakes
DOE has stated that seismic and tectonic effects on the natural systems at Yucca Mountain will not significantly affect repository performance. Yucca Mountain lies in a region of ongoing tectonic deformation, but the deformation rates are too slow to significantly affect the mountain during the 10,000-year regulatory compliance period. Rises in the water table caused by seismic activity would be, at most, a few tens of meters and would not reach the repository. The fractured and faulted volcanic tuff that Yucca Mountain comprises reflects the occurrence of many earthquake-faulting and strong ground motion events during the last several million years, and the hydrological characteristics of the rock would not be changed significantly by seismic events that may occur in the next 10,000 years. The engineered barrier system components will reportedly provide substantial protection of the waste from seepage water, even under severe seismic loading.

In September 2007, it was discovered that the Bow Ridge fault line ran underneath the facility, hundreds of feet east of where it was originally thought to be located, beneath a storage pad where spent radioactive fuel canisters would be cooled before being sealed in a maze of tunnels. The discovery required several structures to be moved several hundred feet further to the east, and drew criticism from Robert R. Loux, then head of the Nevada Agency for Nuclear Projects, who argues that Yucca administrators should have known about the fault line's location years prior, and called the movement of the structures "just-in-time engineering."

In June 2008, a major nuclear equipment supplier, Holtec International, criticized DOE's safety plan for handling containers of radioactive waste before they are buried at the proposed Yucca Mountain dump. The concern is that, in an earthquake, the unanchored casks of nuclear waste material awaiting burial at Yucca Mountain could be sent into a "chaotic melee of bouncing and rolling juggernauts".

Transportation of waste 
The nuclear waste was planned to be shipped to the site by rail and/or truck in robust containers known as spent nuclear fuel shipping casks, approved by the Nuclear Regulatory Commission. While the routes in Nevada would have been public, in the other states the planned routes, dates and times of transport would have been secret for security reasons. State and tribal representatives would have been notified before shipments of spent nuclear fuel entered their jurisdictions.

Nevada routes 

Within Nevada, the planned primary mode of transportation was via rail through the Caliente Corridor. At this point, it turns south.

Other options that were being considered included a rail route along the Mina corridor. This rail route would have originated at the Fort Churchill Siding rail line, near Wabuska. The proposed corridor would have proceeded southeast through Hawthorne, Blair Junction, Lida Junction and Oasis Valley. At Oasis Valley, the rail line would have turned north-northeast towards Yucca Mountain. Use of this rail corridor by DOE would have required permission from the Walker River Paiute Tribe in order to cross their land. As the first  of the proposed corridor was owned by the Department of Defense (DoD), additional permission from the DoD would have to have been granted.

The Nevada Center for Biological Diversity and the Nevada Attorney General both have expressed concern about the transportation routes, "through any number of sensitive habitats."

Impacts 
Since the early 1960s, the U.S. has safely conducted more than 3,000 shipments of spent nuclear fuel without any harmful release of radioactive material. This safety record is comparable to the worldwide experience where more than 70,000 metric tons of spent nuclear fuel have been transported since 1970 – an amount approximately equal to the total amount of spent nuclear fuel that would have been shipped to Yucca Mountain.

But cities were still concerned about the transport of radioactive waste on highways and railroads that may have passed through heavily populated areas. Dr. Robert Halstead, a transportation adviser to the state of Nevada since 1988, said of transportation of the high-level waste, "They would heavily affect cities like Buffalo, Cleveland, Pittsburgh, in the Chicago metropolitan area, in Omaha." "Coming out of the south, the heaviest impacts would be in Atlanta, in Nashville, St. Louis, Kansas City, moving across through Salt Lake City, through downtown Las Vegas, up to Yucca Mountain. And the same cities would be affected by rail shipments as well." Spencer Abraham (DOE) said, "I think there's a general understanding that we move hazardous materials in this country, an understanding that the federal government knows how to do it safely."

In October 2018, a state senator from Utah argued that transferring nuclear waste from other states to Yucca Mountain on state highways and railways could be a health hazard.

Cultural impact 
Archaeological surveys have found evidence that Native Americans used the immediate vicinity of Yucca Mountain on a temporary or seasonal basis. Some Native Americans disagree with the conclusions of archaeological investigators that their ancestors were highly mobile groups of hunter-gatherers who occupied the Yucca Mountain area before Euroamericans began using the area for prospecting, surveying, and ranching. They believe that these conclusions overlook traditional accounts of farming that occurred before European contact.

Yucca Mountain and surrounding lands were central in the lives of the Southern Paiute, Western Shoshone, and Owens Valley Paiute and Shoshone peoples, who shared them for religious ceremonies, resource uses, and social events.

Delays since 2009
Starting in 2009, the Obama administration attempted to close the Yucca Mountain repository, despite current US law that designates Yucca Mountain as the nation's nuclear waste repository. The administration agency, DOE, began implementation of the President's plan in May 2009. The Nuclear Regulatory Commission also went along with the administration's closure plan. Various state and Congressional entities attempted to challenge the administration's closure plans, by statute and in court.

Most recently, in August 2013, a US Court of Appeals decision told the NRC and the Obama administration that they must either "approve or reject [DOE's] application for [the] never-completed waste storage site at Nevada's Yucca Mountain." They cannot simply make plans for its closure in violation of US law.

In May 2009, then United States Secretary of Energy Steven Chu stated:

In 2008, the U.S. Senate Committee on Environmental and Public Works found that failure to perform to contractual requirements could cost taxpayers up to $11 billion by 2020. In 2013, this estimate of taxpayer liability was raised to $21 billion. In July 2009, the House of Representatives voted 388 to 30 on amendments to HHR3183 to not defund the Yucca Mountain repository in the FY2010 budget. In 2013, the House of Representatives voted twice during the 2014 Energy and Water Appropriations debate by over 80% majority to reject elimination of Yucca Mountain as the nation's only nuclear waste solution.

On April 13, 2010, the state of Washington filed suit to prevent the closing of Yucca Mountain, since this would slow efforts to clean up Hanford Nuclear Reservation. South Carolina, Aiken County (the location of Savannah River site) and others joined Washington. The United States Court of Appeals for the District of Columbia Circuit dismissed the suit in July 2011, saying the Nuclear Regulatory Commission had not ruled on the withdrawal of the license application. Washington and South Carolina filed another lawsuit on July 29.

With $32 billion received from power companies to fund the project, and $12 billion spent to study and build it, the federal government had $27 billion left, including interest. In March 2012, Senator Lindsey Graham introduced a bill requiring three-fourths of that money to be given back to customers, and the remainder to the companies for storage improvements.

In August 2013, the U.S. Court of Appeals for the District of Columbia ordered the Nuclear Regulatory Commission to either "approve or reject [DOE's] application for [the] never-completed waste storage site at Nevada's Yucca Mountain." The court opinion said that the NRC was "simply flouting the law" in its previous action to allow the Obama administration to continue plans to close the proposed waste site since a federal law designating Yucca Mountain as the nation's nuclear waste repository remains in effect. The court opinion stated that "The president may not decline to follow a statutory mandate or prohibition simply because of policy objections."

In response, NRC issued the final volumes of the Yucca Mountain Safety Evaluation Report (SER), which included the NRC staff's statement that the site would meet all applicable standards. At the same time, the staff also stated that NRC should not authorize construction of the repository until the requirements for land and water rights were met and a supplement to DOE's environmental impact statement (EIS) was finished. On March 3, 2015, NRC ordered the staff to complete the supplemental EIS and make the Yucca Mountain licensing document database publicly available, using all the remaining previously appropriated licensing funds.

In March 2015, Senator Lamar Alexander introduced the Nuclear Waste Administration Act of 2015 (S854) in the U.S. Senate. It was intended to establish a fully independent Nuclear Waste Administration (NWA) that would develop nuclear waste storage and disposal facilities. Construction of such facilities would require the consent of the state, local, and tribal governments that may be affected. The NWA would be required to complete a mission plan to open a pilot storage facility by 2021 for nuclear waste from non-operating reactors and other "emergency" deliveries (called "priority waste").

The goal would be to have a storage facility for waste from operating reactors or other "non-priority waste" available by 2025, and an actual permanent repository by the end of 2048. The current disposal limit of 70,000 metric tons for the nation's initial permanent repository would be repealed. Any nuclear waste fees collected after S854 was enacted would be held in a newly established Working Capital Fund. The Nuclear Waste Administration would be allowed to draw from that fund any amounts needed to carry out S.854, unless limited by annual appropriations or authorizations. S854 died in committee.

As of September 30, 2021, the Nuclear Waste Fund had an investment fair value of $52.4 billion.

Related legislation (2017–2019) 
On March 15, 2017, the Trump Administration announced it would request Congressional approval for $120 million to restart licensing activity at the Yucca Mountain repository, with funding also to be used to create an interim storage program. The project would consolidate nuclear waste across the United States in Yucca Mountain, which had been stockpiled in local locations since 2010. The federal budget proposal was refused by Senate. Although his administration had allocated money to the project, in October 2018, President Donald Trump stated he opposed the use of Yucca mountain for dumping, saying he agreed "with the people of Nevada."

On May 11, 2018, the bill H.R. 3053 was approved in a 340–72 vote in the House of Representatives. The bill directed the DOE to resume the licensing process for Yucca Mountain, with licensing for a permanent site at the mountain to "take up to five years." The Nuclear Waste Policy Amendments Act was sponsored by John Shimkus. The Hill clarified that the bill would "set a path forward for the DOE to resume the process of planning for and building the southern Nevada site, transfer land to the DOE for it, ease the federal funding mechanism and allow DOE to build or license a temporary site to store waste while the Yucca project is being planned and built."

The bill would "direct [DOE] to revive the licensing process for Yucca Mountain to be designated as the country’s permanent site for nuclear waste." The bill would bring together waste from 121 locations in 39 states. All Nevada representatives opposed the bill. The measure was scheduled to go to the Senate next, and if passed there, would require the Nuclear Regulatory Commission to decide on the matter within 30 months.

The Hill noted that the bill received widespread support from lawmakers arguing that nuclear waste was best transferred out of their districts to Yucca, a concept opposed by Nevada representatives, with politicians such as Dina Titus dubbing it the "Screw Nevada 2.0" bill. Titus proposed an amendment that would have required long-term storage to be kept in locales that consented, which the House rejected, 332–80. In their opposition to the use of Yucca Mountain as a nuclear repository, Nevada representatives were supported by Dianne Feinstein of California and other politicians.

In June 2018, the Trump administration and some members of Congress again began proposing using Yucca Mountain, with Nevada Senators raising opposition. By early 2019, use of Yucca Mountain was in "political limbo" as opposition to the site led to an impasse. In January 2019, a panel of scientists introduced to Congress a 126-page report, Reset of America’s Nuclear Waste Management, which proposed including Yucca Mountain as a potential repository with "development of a consensus-based siting process, but one that would still include Yucca Mountain as a candidate."

Nevada National Security Site officials in April 2019 assured the public that the Device Assembly Facility on the Nevada security site was safe from earthquake threats. In contrast, Nevada officials claimed seismic activity in the region made it unsafe for the storage of nuclear waste. On April 1, 2019, the Las Vegas Review-Journal noted that "Nevada Democrats in the House" were seeking to block transfers of plutonium from DOE into the state by the use of the appropriations process.

See also 
Horizontal Drillhole
Deep Geological Repository
Deep Borehole
Anti-nuclear movement in the United States
 Bullfrog County, Nevada
 Gudmundur S. (Bo) Bodvarsson
 High-level radioactive waste management
 Hui-Hai Liu
Journey to the Safest Place on Earth
 List of nuclear waste treatment technologies
 Morris Operation
 Onkalo spent nuclear fuel repository, Finland, the world's first repository
 Waste Isolation Pilot Plant
 Yucca Mountain Johnny

References

Further reading 

  Set of articles by technical experts on numerous scientific and technical issues that are unresolved; presents arguments that Yucca Mountain has not been and may never be shown to be an appropriate repository for high-level radioactive waste. Does not pass judgment on suitability of the site.
  Focuses on the mountain as well as the city of Las Vegas.
 Review:

External links 

 Annotated bibliography for the Yucca Mountain repository from the Alsos Digital Library for Nuclear Issues
 Complete archive of Yucca Mountain news coverage from the Las Vegas Review-Journal
 Environmental Protection Agency – Yucca Mountain (documents)
 Examination of the Licensing Process for the Yucca Mountain Repository: Hearing before the Committee on Environment and Public Works, United States Senate, One Hundred Tenth Congress, First Session, October 31, 2007 
 Google Maps Google Maps satellite image
 Nuclear Files.org – Yucca Mountain (documents)
 "Nuclear Waste" – Sierra Club fact sheet in opposition to Yucca Mountain project
 Real time earthquake map for the vicinity of Yucca Mountain-- Southern Nevada and California (U.S. Geological Survey)
 Russia plans to take world's spent nuclear fuel
 State of Nevada Nuclear Projects Position and activities of the Agency, with links to Federal, State, local government, and private organization websites providing a balanced picture of the controversy and facts surrounding the project.
 The Monumental Task of Warning Future Generations (Yucca Mountain warning signs) (archive link)
 "Time to Think the Unthinkable", Testimony before EPA by David Comarow, Esq.
 U.S. Senate Roll Call Votes 107th Congress – 2nd Session July 9, 2002 cloture vote on S.J. Res. 34
 Yucca Mountain Project (Office of Civilian Radioactive Waste Management, United States Department of Energy) (archive link)
 Yucca Mountain Could Face Greater Volcanic Threat (State of Nevada Agency for Nuclear Projects, Office of the Governor)
 Office of Civilian Radioactive Waste Management
 More on the Yucca Mountain Repository
 Final Report to the Secretary of Energy by the Blue Ribbon Commission
"Sebastian Musch: The Atomic Priesthood and Nuclear Waste Management – Religion, Sci-fi Literature and the End of our Civilization
Yucca Mountain Research Collection at the University of Nevada, Reno

Environment of Nevada
History of Nevada
History of Nye County, Nevada
Nuclear history of the United States
Radioactive waste repositories in the United States
Subterranea of the United States
United States Department of Energy facilities
Tunnels in Nevada